The Roscommon Senior Hurling Championship is an annual Gaelic Athletic Association competition organised by Roscommon GAA among the top hurling clubs in County Roscommon, Ireland. Since 2008 the winner goes on to play in the Connacht Intermediate Club Hurling Championship, the winner of which progresses to the All-Ireland Intermediate Club Hurling Championship. Before this Roscommon champions competed in the Connacht Senior Club Hurling Championship.
Athleague are the current champions, defeating Tremane in the 2021 decider; Athleague 3-12 Tremane 0-15. (Four Roads lead the Roll of Honour with 35 titles, followed by Roscommon Gaels with 24 titles (last won in 1970). In the past Roscommon Gaels competed as St Coman's and Roscommon Town, while St Dominic's previously competed as St Patrick's. 

Ballygar (County Galway) participated in the championship from the 1920s, winning two titles in 1930 and 1985, before transferring back to Galway in 1994. Since 1998, seven clubs compete in the championship, namely Athleague, Four Roads, Oran, Pádraig Pearse's, Roscommon Gaels, St Dominic's and Tremane.

Roll of honour

List of finals

 Bold indicates Connacht championship winners.

References

External links
 Official Roscommon Website
 Roscommon on Hoganstand
 Roscommon Club GAA

Senior
Hurling
Senior hurling county championships